This article lists Muslim scholars of the 1st century AH. During the 1st century AH (622 – 719 CE), Mecca and Medina were the centers of knowledge. The Sahaba were the primary narrators of hadith during this period.

List

References

See also

 
7th-century Islamic religious leaders
8th-century Muslim theologians
8th-century Islamic religious leaders